The Fairly OddParents originated from a mini-series of 7-minute shorts on the Oh Yeah! Cartoons showcase. The series premiere, appropriately named "The Fairly Odd Parents!" is the pilot of the series which showcase the debut appearances of Timmy Turner, Cosmo, Wanda, and Vicky.

Episodes 

Every short was written, storyboarded and directed by series creator Butch Hartman. Zac Moncrief co-boarded "Too Many Timmys!", Bob Boyle co-boarded "Party of Three!", Sean Bishop co-board "The Fairy Flu!" and Steve Marmel and Mike Bell co-wrote "Super Humor".

Other shorts
Nickelodeon showed the first three Crimson Chin webisodes compiled with all of the Oh Yeah! Cartoons shorts as well with "Where's the Wand?". When the Oh Yeah! Cartoons shorts were rerun, Mary Kay Bergman's Timmy voice was redubbed by Tara Strong. However, these shorts have stopped airing after the television special US premiere of The Big Superhero Wish in February 2004. The original shorts with Mary Kay Bergman as Timmy Turner are available on DVD.

Home media
"The Fairly OddParents!" and "Where's the Wand?" on the School's Out! The Musical DVD.
"Too Many Timmys!," "The Fairy Flu," and "The Temp" on The Jimmy Timmy Power Hour 2: When Nerds Collide DVD.
"Scout's Honor," "The Really Bad Day!" and "Super Humor" on the Fairy Idol DVD.
"Party of Three" and "The Zappys" on The Jimmy Timmy Power Hour 3: The Jerkinators DVD.

References 

Film series introduced in 1998
Shorts
Mass media franchises introduced in 1998
American animated short films
1990s animated short films
2000s animated short films
1998 in American television
1999 in American television
2000 in American television
2002 in American television
Animated short film series